Gerd de Keijzer (born 18 January 1994, in Hoogeloon) is a Dutch cyclist, who currently rides for UCI ProTeam .

References

External links

1994 births
Living people
Dutch male cyclists
People from Bladel
Cyclists from North Brabant
People with type 1 diabetes